Kalash is an Indian television soap opera which aired on Star Plus. It was produced by Ekta Kapoor of Balaji Telefilms.

Plot
Kalash is the story of two sisters: Rano and Bulbul. Bulbul, the elder of the two, is beautiful but selfish, whereas Rano is caring and loving. The sisters develop romantic feelings for the same man, Ram. Bulbul is married to Ram against her wishes. Later, she leaves her husband and their child and elopes with another man. Rano is then married to Ram because he has a child, slowly she begins to fall for him and Ram too starts liking her when Bulbul suddenly reappears and wants her family back. After Bulbul conspires and tries to separate Ram and Rano. The show ended with Rano's death by cancer and Bulbul realizing her mistake and reunites with Ram.

Cast
 Amar Upadhyay / Aman Verma as Ram
 Dolly Sohi as Rano
 Chetan Pandit

References

Balaji Telefilms television series
Indian television series
2001 Indian television series debuts
StarPlus original programming
Indian television soap operas
2003 Indian television series endings

fr:Kalasā
hi:कलश